A corporate ecosystem is a collection of organizations that are interdependent to form a complete solution or industry. The term became popular in business in the post Dot.com era and replaces the 1990s term keiretsu.

Strategic management